Europa Universalis is a grand strategy video game developed by Paradox Development Studio and published in 2000 by Strategy First.

Development
The game was originally based on a French board game of the same name by Philippe Thibaut that was released in 1993. To facilitate the new game, a new proprietary software engine, known as the Europa Engine, was developed. The game went gold on January 23, 2001.

Gameplay
Europa Universalis lets the player take control of one of seven European nations (others are available in different scenarios) from 1492 to 1801, expanding its power through military might, diplomacy, and colonial wealth. The game takes place on a map divided into 3,633 provinces, and proceeds in a pausable real time format.

The player starts the game on a two-dimensional map, which is divided into provinces and sea zones. Part of the presented world is invisible for the player (terra incognita) – it is however possible to explore individual provinces.

The player directs one of the eight European powers available in the scenario and represents the individual historical rulers. They change over time according to historical realities and have different skills that translate into the development of the country. For example, John III Sobieski has high military skills in the game and Suleiman the Magnificent is a character with high administrative skills. The game features a number of historical events, such as the Reformation, the Treaty of Tordesillas and the uprising in the Netherlands, which have a significant impact on the game.

The player can take care of technological development in his own country by allocating part of the budget to research. Technological progress is linear and consists in reaching higher and higher levels of technology in four areas: army, navy, infrastructure and trade. With progressive development, the player gains new capabilities, such as improved units. It is also possible to increase spending to maintain stability in the state or to abandon all subsidies to increase the state treasury at the expense of rising inflation.

Rebellions of the population can be a problem for internal development. Rebellions occur when there are differences between the state religion and the religion followed in a province (there are several different faiths and religions in the game), taxation of the population through the establishment of a tax collector's office, or as a result of game-activated events. Rebels can even secede from the state and declare independence. Therefore, the stability system plays an important role in the game, which determines the risk of rebellion in the provinces, as well as the speed of city development and the amount of taxes collected.

A special element of the game is the colonisation of uninhabited territories. The player, using conquistadors (in the case of land forces) and explorers (for sea forces) has the possibility to discover new provinces and thanks to the settlers can settle the chosen territory.

Reception

John Lee reviewed the PC version of the game for Next Generation, rating it three stars out of five, and stated that "a full-bodied simulation of European turmoil and global expansion between the 15th and 18th centuries, Europa Universalis isn't all that original, but if historic realism is your passion, you'll like what you see".

The game became a surprise hit for its great deal of depth and strategy. Paradox used this success to springboard other titles such as Victoria, Crusader Kings, and Hearts of Iron.

The editors of Computer Games Magazine nominated Europa Universalis as the best strategy game of 2001, but ultimately gave the award to Civilization III. Europa Universalis received "generally favourable" reviews according to review aggregator Metacritic.

Legacy
Europa Universalis was the first in the series, followed by Europa Universalis II, Europa Universalis III, Europa Universalis: Rome and Europa Universalis IV.

See also

List of grand strategy video games 
List of Paradox Interactive games 
Wargame (video games)

References

External links 
 Official website (archived)
 

2000 video games
Age of Discovery video games
Grand strategy video games
Paradox Interactive games
Real-time strategy video games
Video games based on board games
Video games developed in Sweden
Video games set in the 15th century
Video games set in the 16th century
Video games set in the 17th century
Video games set in the 18th century
Video games set in the Russian Empire
Windows games
Windows-only games
Strategy First games
Plaion
Multiplayer and single-player video games